Sorachi may refer: to one of two places on 
 The Sorachi Subprefecture on the island of Hokkaidō, Japan
 Sorachi District, Hokkaido on the island of Hokkaidō, Japan, which is divided between the Sorachi Subprefecture and the Kamikawa Subprefecture
 Hideaki Sorachi, the author of the Gintama manga series
 The 16594 Sorachi main-belt asteroid
Sorachi Ace hops for flavouring beer

Japanese-language surnames